Kirsten Passer (13 March 1930 – 22 March 2012) was a Danish film actress. She appeared in 29 films between 1955 and 1976. She was born in Nårup, Denmark. She is the sister of Danish actor Dirch Passer.

Filmography

 Brand-Børge rykker ud (1976)
 Der må være en sengekant (1975)
 Romantik på sengekanten (1973)
 Motorvej på sengekanten (1972)
 Rektor på sengekanten (1972)
 Tandlæge på sengekanten (1971)
 Sangen om den røde rubin (1970)
 Far laver sovsen (1967)
 Mig og min lillebror (1967)
 Min kones ferie (1967)
 Flådens friske fyre (1965)
 Passer passer piger (1965)
 Når enden er go' (1964)
 Pigen og pressefotografen (1963)
 Der brænder en ild (1962)
 Far til fire med fuld musik (1961)
 Poeten og Lillemor i forårshumør (1961)
 Mine tossede drenge (1961)
 Elefanter på loftet (1960)
 Far til fire på Bornholm (1959)
 Vagabonderne på Bakkegården (1958)
 Far til fire og ulveungerne (1958)
 Ung kærlighed (1958)
 Far til fire og onkel Sofus (1957)
 Natlogi betalt (1957)
 Far til fire i byen (1956)
 Den kloge mand (1956)
 Taxa K 1640 efterlyses (1956)
 Altid ballade (1955)

References

External links

1930 births
2012 deaths
Danish film actresses
People from Assens Municipality